Teulisna is a genus of moths in the family Erebidae. The genus was erected by Francis Walker in 1862. They are found in Sri Lanka, India, Myanmar, Borneo and Java.

Description
Palpi short, porrect (extending forward) and hairy. Antennae of male with short cilia and bristles. Forewings are triangular with acute apex and erect outer margin. A fringe of long scales in the basal part of the cell on upperside. Veins 3 and 4 stalked and vein 5 absent. Veins 6 to 9 stalked, veins 10 from cell. Areole absent. Vein 11 anastomosing (fusing) with vein 12. Male with the bent median nervure and narrow cell outer part. Neuration somewhat distorted. Hindwing with veins 3, 4 and 6, 7 stalked and vein 5 absent. Vein 8 from middle of cell. Male with a patch of modified scales at base of median nervure. The cell short and discocellulars oblique.

Species

 Teulisna atratella (Walker, 1864)
 Teulisna basigera (Walker, 1865)
 Teulisna bertha Butler, 1877
 Teulisna bipectinis Fang, 2000
 Teulisna bipunctata (Walker, 1866)
 Teulisna chiloides Walker, 1862
 Teulisna curviplaga (Rothschild, 1912)
 Teulisna divisa (Walker, 1862)
 Teulisna harmani Holloway, 2001
 Teulisna macropallida Holloway, 2001
 Teulisna montanebulosa Holloway, 2001
 Teulisna murina (Heylaerts, 1891)
 Teulisna nebulosa (Walker, 1862)
 Teulisna nigricauda Holloway, 1982
 Teulisna obliquistria Hampson, 1894
 Teulisna pallidicauda Holloway, 2001
 Teulisna perdentata (Druce, 1899)
 Teulisna plagiata Walker, 1862
 Teulisna pseudochiloides Holloway, 2001
 Teulisna quadratella Holloway, 2001
 Teulisna reflexa Holloway, 2001
 Teulisna ruptifascia (Talbot, 1926)
 Teulisna semibrunnea Heylaerts, 1891
 Teulisna setiniformis (Hampson, 1900)
 Teulisna steineri Holloway, 2001
 Teulisna tricornuta Holloway, 2001
 Teulisna tumida (Walker, 1862)
 Teulisna uniformis (Hampson, 1894)
 Teulisna uniplaga Hampson, 1894

Former species
 Teulisna tetragona (Walker, 1854)

References

External links

 
Lithosiina
Moth genera
Taxa named by Francis Walker (entomologist)